Shajara-i Tarākima is a Chagatai-language historical work completed in 1659 by Khan of Khiva and historian Abu al-Ghazi Bahadur.

Shajara-i Tarākima is one of the two works composed by Abu al-Ghazi Bahadur that have great importance in learning Central Asian history, the other being the Shajara-i Turk (Genealogy of the Turks), which was completed by his son, Abu al-Muzaffar Anusha Muhammad Bahadur, in 1665. Shajara-i Tarākima describes the history of Turkmens since ancient times, the birth and life of the ancient ancestor of all Turkmens and the progenitor hero of all Turkic peoples - Oghuz Khan, his campaigns to conquer various countries and regions of Eurasia, as well as the rule of the Oghuz-Turkmen khans in the Middle Ages. Shajara-i Tarākima is also a significant literary work, as it describes numerous Turkmen folk legends, tales, etymologies of ethnonyms, proverbs and sayings.

According to Abu al-Ghazi, " the 'Genealogy of the Turkmens' was written ""at the request of the Turkmen mullahs, sheikhs and beks"", who believed that the previous Oghuznamas were full of "errors and differences" and that it was necessary to give an official version of the legend of the origin of the Turkmens.

Abu al-Ghazi Bahadur 
Abu al-Ghazi Bahadur was the Khan of Khiva and a prominent historian of the Turkic peoples, who wrote his works in Chagatai language. He was born in 1603 in Urgench, Khanate of Khiva, the son of ruler Arab Muhammad Khan. He fled to the Safavid court in Isfahan after a power struggle arose among him and his brothers. He lived there in exile from 1629 until 1639 studying Persian and Arabic history. In 1644 or 1645 he acceded to the throne, a position he would hold for twenty years. He died in Khiva in 1663.

Content

Shajara-i Tarākima can be divided into three parts: information of a quranic nature (the story of Adam); information based on the Oghuz-Turkmen epic, which includes the story of Oghuz-Khan and his descendants, and information acquired through oral tradition about the origin, division and location of the Oghuz tribes (in particular, the legend of Salyr), about Tamga, Ongons and others.

Shajara-i Tarākima roughly follows Rashīd ad-Dīn’s already Islamized and Mongolized (post-conquest) version about the origin of Oghuz Khan and Turkmens. But in his account, Oghuz Khan is fully integrated into Islamic and Mongol traditional history. The account begins with descent from Adam to Noah, who after the flood sends his three sons to repopulate the earth: Ham was sent to Hindustan, Sam to Iran, and Yafes was sent to the banks of the Itil and Yaik rivers. Yafes had eight sons named Turk, Khazar, Saqlab, Rus, Ming, Chin, Kemeri, and Tarikh. As he was dying, he established Turk as his successor.

Tribal Organizations of Ancient Turkmens

According to the Genealogy of the Turkmens, Oghuz Khan had six sons in total, and each of them in turn had 4 sons from their first wives and several more from their other wives. Twenty-four grandsons from the first wives of the sons of Oghuz Khan were the ancestors of the 24 oldest and main Oghuz-Turkmen tribes and the heads of the so-called "Aimak". Each of the main 24 tribes was joined by other tribes whose ancestors were the grandsons of Oghuz Khan from the secondary wives of his sons and so on: this is the main association of several clans that formed a single "Aimak".

Two united Aimaks formed "yuzluks". The yuzluks, in turn, were grouped into two main groups: "Bozoks" (senior tribes) and "Uchoks" (junior tribes). Thus, the entire ancient Oghuz-Turkmen people were divided into two parts (Bozok and Uchok): each of these parts was divided into 12 yuzluks, and each of the yuzluks was divided into two Aimaks.

24 Oghuz Turkmen tribes according to the Genealogy of the Turkmens by Abu al-Ghazi Bahadur:

Bozoks (Gray Arrows)

Gün Han
Kayı (Ottomans and Jandarids)
Bayat (Qajars, Dulkadirids, Fuzûlî)
Alkaevli
Karaevli
Ay Han
Yazır
Döger (Artuqids)
Dodurga
Yaparlı
Yyldyz Han
Afshar (Afsharids and Zengids)
Kızık
Begdili (Khwarazmian dynasty )
Kargın

Üçoks (Three Arrows)

Gök Han
Bayandur (founders of the Ak Koyunlu, Kara Koyunlu)
Pecheneg (Pechenegs)
Çavuldur (Tzachas)
Chepni (refer to Küresünni)
Dag Han
Salur (Kadi Burhan al-Din, Salghurids and Karamanids; see also: Salars)
Eymür
Alayuntlu
Yüreğir (Ramadanids)
Dengiz Han
Iğdır
Büğdüz
Yıva (Qara Qoyunlu and Oghuz Yabgu State)
Kınık (founders of the Seljuk Empire)
List of ancient Turkmen tribes whose forefathers were born from the younger wives of Oguz Khan's sons:

Kene - Gune - Turbatly - Gireyli - Soltanly - Okly - Gekly - Kyrgyz - Suchly - Horasanly - Yurtchy - Jamchy - Turumchy - Kumy - Sorky - Kurjyk - Sarajyk - Karajyk - Tekin - Kazygurt - Lala - Merdeshuy - Sayir.

The list of tribes whose ancestors were leaders in the army and close associates of Oghuz Khan, and which were considered part of the Oghuz (Turkmens) in ancient times and the Middle Ages:

Kangly - Kypchak - Karlyk - Khalach

Edition
 Ebülgâzî Bahadir Han (Khan of Khorezm), Shejere-i Terākime, Simurg, 1996,

See also
Oghuz Turks
Turkic peoples
Turkmens
Dede Korkut
Khanate of Khiva

References

Further reading
 E. G. Ambros, P. A. Andrews, Ç. Balım, L. Bazin, J. Cler, P. B. Golden, A. Gökalp, B. Flemming, G. Hazai, A. T. Karamustafa, S. Kleinmichel, P. Zieme, E. J. Zürcher; Artikel Turks, Encyclopaedia of Islam, Digital Edition, The Tribal History Of The Central Asian Turks.
 Mahmud al-Kashgari; "Dīwān Lughāt al-Turk".
 
 

1659 books
17th-century works
Chagatai Turkic literature